The 2019 World TeamTennis season was the 44th season of the top professional team tennis league in the United States.

The Springfield Lasers defeated the New York Empire in the WTT Finals to defend the King Trophy as WTT champions.

Competition format

The 2019 World TeamTennis season included eight teams. Each team played a 14-match regular-season schedule with seven home and seven away matches. The top four teams in the regular season (14–31 July) qualified for the World TeamTennis playoffs at the Orleans Arena in Las Vegas, with the semifinals on 2 August and the WTT Finals on 3 August. The winner of the WTT Finals was awarded the King Trophy.

Teams and players

Standings
The top four teams qualified for the 2019 WTT Semifinals.

Results table

Statistical leaders
The table below shows the WTT team and the player who had the highest regular-season winning percentages in each of the league's five events. Only players who played in at least 40% of the total number of games played by their team in a particular event are eligible to be listed.

 Most Valuable Players  Female MVP: Raquel Atawo  Male MVP: Neal Skupski

Playoff bracket

WTT Finals

 Finals MVP: Robert Lindstedt

See also

 Team tennis

References

External links
 Official website

World TeamTennis season
World TeamTennis seasons